Sukashitrochus carinatus is a species of minute sea snail, a marine gastropod mollusk or micromollusk in the family Scissurellidae, the little slit snails.

Description
The shell attains a height of 2 mm. The shell has an ovate, depressed shape. The spire is nearly plane. The 2½ whorls are plane. The body whorl is radiately striate above the carina (more strongly at the sutures). It is ornamented below the carina with elevated, transverse cinguli. The base has elevated concentric lines with its interstices cancellated. The aperture is oblique. The inner lip recedes.

This species  has a foramen instead of a fissure. It is characterized by a flattened spire and three prominent keels on the last whorl below the carinate periphery. It most nearly resembles Sukashitrochus dorbignyi (Audouin, 1826) but there are three keels besides the fissural carina.

Distribution
This marine species occurs off Japan.

References

 Higo, S., Callomon, P. & Goto, Y. (1999). Catalogue and bibliography of the marine shell-bearing Mollusca of Japan. Osaka. : Elle Scientific Publications. 749 pp

External links
 To Encyclopedia of Life
 To World Register of Marine Species
 

Scissurellidae
Gastropods described in 1862